Nucula atacellana, or the cancellate nut shell clam, is a marine bivalve mollusc in the family Nuculidae. It can be found along the Atlantic coast of North America, ranging from Cape Cod to Virginia.

References

Nuculidae
Molluscs described in 1939